Constance Marten and Mark Gordon are a British couple who were missing from 5 January 2023, when their car was found abandoned and on fire near Bolton, to 27 February 2023, when they were arrested in Brighton.

They went missing with their newborn baby, who was believed to have been born a few days before they went missing. A baby's remains were found on 1 March 2023 in a bag in a shed on an allotment near where the couple were arrested.

Background
Constance Marten was born into an aristocratic family in 1987 and grew up in Crichel House in Dorset. She has been estranged from her family in reaction to beginning a relationship with Gordon in 2016 when Marten was a drama student.

Mark Gordon was born in Birmingham, West Midlands, in 1974, but moved to Florida, United States, with his mother when he was young. In 1989, aged 14, he broke into a neighbour's property and raped her at knifepoint. He was found guilty of "one count of armed kidnapping, four separate counts of armed sexual battery and one count of burglary with a deadly weapon". He served 20 years in prison before being deported back to the UK in 2010.

Search
The couple were sought by police from 5 January 2023, when their car was found abandoned and on fire next to the M61 motorway in Bolton, Greater Manchester. Marten had given birth earlier that month. The couple travelled by taxi to Liverpool, then Harwich in Essex, then London and finally to Brighton on 8 January.

More than 100 officers of the Metropolitan Police were involved in the initial search, assisted by the National Crime Agency.

A baby's remains were found almost 48 hours after the search began, having been wrapped in a plastic bag and hidden inside a shed on an allotment.

Arrest
The couple were found and arrested in Hollingbury, Brighton, on 27 February. On 1 March, the remains of a baby which is believed to be theirs and to have died weeks earlier was found: it was revealed on 3 March that baby had been wrapped in a plastic bag and hidden inside a shed on an allotment near to where the couple were arrested.

On 3 March, the couple appeared before Crawley Magistrates' Court, charged with manslaughter, concealing the birth of a child and perverting the course of justice. During the court appearance, it was revealed that their baby was a girl named Victoria. They were both remanded in custody, and will appear at Central London's Old Bailey on 31 March.

Reactions 

On 2 March at 6 p.m., a candlelight vigil was held at St Mary Magdalene's Church in Coldean, Brighton, in honour of the baby.

A memorial was made on the corner between Stanmer Villas and Golf Drive, near to where the baby was found, where people left flowers, soft toys and messages. Two detectives from Sussex Police and the Met who are leading the investigation were also seen leaving flowers at the memorial.

See also
List of solved missing person cases

References

2023 in England
2020s missing person cases
Couples
February 2023 events in the United Kingdom
Formerly missing people
January 2023 events in the United Kingdom
March 2023 events in the United Kingdom
Missing person cases in England